The term "Supreme court building" refers to buildings housing supreme courts in a number of countries, including the following:

Present supreme court buildings
Canada – Supreme Court Building
India – Supreme Court Building
Israel – Supreme Court Building
Pakistan – Supreme Court Building
Singapore – Supreme Court Building
United Kingdom – Supreme Court Building
United States – United States Supreme Court Building
Puerto Rico (U.S. territory) – Supreme Court Building (Puerto Rico)
Former supreme court buildings
Germany – Imperial Supreme Court Building
Hong Kong – Old Supreme Court Building, Hong Kong
Singapore – Old Supreme Court Building, Singapore

+